Luke Matheson may refer to:

 Luke Matheson (footballer) (born 2002), English footballer for Rochdale
 Luke Matheson (Ravenswood), character